Panaretella is a genus of South African huntsman spiders that was first described by R. F. Lawrence in 1937.

Species
 it contains five species, found in South Africa:
Panaretella distincta (Pocock, 1896) (type) – South Africa
Panaretella immaculata Lawrence, 1952 – South Africa
Panaretella minor Lawrence, 1952 – South Africa
Panaretella scutata (Pocock, 1902) – South Africa
Panaretella zuluana Lawrence, 1937 – South Africa

See also
 List of Sparassidae species

References

Araneomorphae genera
Sparassidae
Spiders of South Africa